Richard Pope, B.S.C. (born 1947) is a British cinematographer who worked with British film director Mike Leigh. 

He won eight film awards.

Filmography

Awards and nominations 
 1988 – Porterhouse Blue (nominated) BAFTA TV Award Best Film Cameraman
 1990 – The Reflecting Skin (won) – Sitges - Catalan International Film Festival Best Cinematography
 1995 – Nothing Personal (nominated) Camerimage Golden Frog
 1996 – Secrets & Lies (won) Camerimage Golden Frog
 1999 – Camerimage – Special Award Best Duo: Director – Cinematographer (shared with Mike Leigh)
 2004 – Vera Drake (won) Camerimage Golden Frog
 2006 – The Illusionist (won) San Diego Film Critics Society Awards – SDFCS Award – Best Cinematography
 2007 – The Illusionist (nominated) Academy Award Best Achievement in Cinematography
 2007 – The Illusionist (nominated) American Society of Cinematographers ASC Award – Outstanding Achievement in Cinematography in Theatrical Releases
 2007 – The Illusionist (won) Camerimage Silver Frog
 2014 – Mr. Turner (won) Cannes Film Festival Vulcan Award
 2014 – Mr. Turner (nominated) Academy Award Best Achievement in Cinematography
 2015 – Royal Photographic Society Lumière Award For major achievement in British cinematography, video or animation.

References

External links

1947 births
British cinematographers
Living people
People from Bromley